Edinburgh Castle, an estate and now ruined great house in St Ann, was built by Jamaica's earliest recorded serial killer, Lewis Hutchinson. It had two circular, loopholed towers diagonally at opposite corners. The ruins are on the list of National Heritage Sites in Jamaica. 

There is also a small settlement of this name in St Thomas at

In popular media 
In Assassin's Creed III, the decaying abandoned Edinburgh Castle can be explored by the game's fictional protagonist Connor Kenway, in search for one of the pieces of Captain Kidd's treasure map which ended up in Lewis Hutchinson's private collection after he supposedly killed Joseph Palmer only for it to be stolen by another of Hutchinson's victims.

See also
Jamaica National Heritage Trust
List of Plantation Great Houses in Jamaica

References

External links
Aerial view.

Great Houses in Jamaica
National Heritage Sites of Jamaica
Ruins in Jamaica
Buildings and structures in Saint Ann Parish
Plantations in Jamaica